TUI fly Deutschland, formerly TUIfly, is a German leisure airline owned by the travel and tourism company TUI Group. It is headquartered at Hannover Airport with bases at several other German airports. TUI fly Deutschland is part of TUI Group's airline unit.

History

Formation
The airline was formed in 2007 by the merger of Hapag Lloyd Flug and Hapag Lloyd Express as a branch of TUI Travel. The airline codes of its predecessor are still in use, and the callsign YELLOWCAB was used until it was changed to TUIJET on 24 September 2010.

In the second quarter of 2007, the load factor was at about 79%, compared to about 92% the year before. The company closed its Leipzig/Halle and Bremen bases. On 29 January 2008, plans were announced to merge TUIfly with Eurowings and Germanwings (Lufthansa low-cost subsidiaries) to form a joint and independent holding company, but the talks were ultimately unsuccessful.

TUI Travel confirmed on 27 March 2009 that it had signed a strategic partnership with Air Berlin that would see TUI Travel take a 20% stake in Air Berlin, and Air Berlin 20% in TUI fly Germany. Due to regulatory concerns, this was changed to 9.9%. Air Berlin was also to wet-lease 17 aircraft from TUI fly and take over all of TUI fly Germany's city connections. TUI was to focus on serving the charter market with 21 aircraft. From 25 October 2009 onwards, all German domestic flights previously operated by TUI fly Germany were operated by Air Berlin, as well as all flights to Austria, Italy and Croatia. Most of these flights were still operated by TUI fly Germany aircraft, but were marketed by Air Berlin.

Development since 2013
In December 2013, TUI fly Deutschland abandoned their distinctive yellow livery and replaced it by a blue design which had already been introduced at TUI fly Netherlands, TUI fly Belgium and TUI Airways. The first plane in the new colours arrived in Hannover on 17 February 2014. The livery was updated in 2016, with titles shortened from "TUIfly" to "TUI".

In September 2014, TUI fly Deutschland decided to relocate their operations at Zweibrücken Airport to nearby Saarbrücken Airport as Zweibrücken Airport faced bankruptcy and an uncertain future. In January 2016, TUI fly Deutschland also announced it would leave Hamburg Airport entirely due to the increasing competition from low-cost carriers. The summer seasonal routes did not resume, and all remaining routes ended by March 2016.

In September 2016 plans were announced to merge TUI fly Deutschland with [[Air Berlin]|Air Berlin's]] leisure operations  - which were partially operated by TUI fly Germany - as well as Air Berlin's entire Austrian subsidiary Niki. 
On 5 October 2016, TUI fly Deutschland confirmed it was in talks with Air Berlin and Etihad Airways to create a new holding company for leisure operations. The new company was planned to serve important holiday destinations from Germany, Austria and Switzerland. 
In June 2017 TUI Group and Etihad Aviation Group announced that joint venture negotiations had ended.

In July 2018, the airline announced it would close its base at Karlsruhe/Baden-Baden Airport by October 2018.

TUI Group has 70 737 MAXs on order. The order consists of 18 MAX 10 aircraft, with the remaining variants unspecified as of June 2017. In January 2019, it was announced that TUI fly Deutschland would receive 25 of these 737 MAX by 2023.

After the demise of Germania in early 2019, TUI fly Deutschland announced it would base aircraft at Nuremberg Airport to fly to several leisure destinations. In November 2019, it was announced that the airline planned to operate its own long-haul flights to destinations in the Caribbean and Mexico, similar to its sister airlines. Initially, the airline was to have taken on two Boeing 787s to operate these flights with plans to increase the number in the future. The flights were originally planned to begin in the Winter 2020/21 season, with scheduled and charter services to the Dominican Republic, Mexico, Jamaica, and Barbados. The plans were shelved for the foreseeable future in the wake of the COVID-19 pandemic.

In October 2020, TUI fly Deutschland retired their last of their 20 Boeing 737-700s. Several of them had been  operated on a long-term wetlease basis on behalf of now defunct Air Berlin. In December 2020, the airline announced a major downsizing in operations with a reduction from over 30 to 17 aircraft while also terminating all services from Cologne/Bonn, Basel/Mulhouse, Paderborn/Lippstadt and Karlsruhe/Baden-Baden.

Operations
TUI fly Deutschland offers both charter and scheduled flights with about 60% of all seats sold directly, 30% as a part of a TUI holiday package and 10% by other agencies. TUI fly Deutschland itself offers drinks, snacks, and meals on flights to and from Cape Verde, Egypt, Greece, Israel, southern Italy, Morocco, Portugal, Spain including the Canary Islands, and Tunisia. Hot meals are served on the longest flights, including those to the Canary Islands, Cape Verde, Egypt, and Madeira.

Destinations

TUI fly Deutschland operates from several German airports to leisure destinations mainly around the Mediterranean, such as Spain and Greece. The airline does not operate long-haul flights contrary to some of other TUI Airlines.

Fleet

Current fleet

, the TUI fly Deutschland fleet consists of the following aircraft:

Former fleet

TUI fly Deutschland formerly operated the following aircraft:

See also
List of airlines of Germany

References

External links

Official website of TUIfly
Official website of the TUI Group

Airlines of Germany
Airlines established in 2007
European Low Fares Airline Association
TUI Group
Charter airlines